Xia Suchu (1889–????) was a politician in the Chinese Republic. He was an important politician during the Provisional Government of the Republic of China and the Wang Jingwei regime (Republic of China-Nanjing). His art-name was Xuchu. He was born in Maha (now Majiang County), Guizhou.

Biography
Xia Suchu went to Japan where he successively graduated the 1st Junior High School of Kyoto and the 1st High School (:ja:第一高等学校 (旧制)). Later he returned to China, he belonged to Huang Fu, and worked in the Beiping Political Affairs Readjustment Commission. In December 1935 the Hebei–Chahar Political Council was established, he also worked in it.

In December 1937 Wang Kemin established the Provisional Government of the Republic of China. Xia Suchu also participated in it, and was appointed a director to the Relief Bureau. In next September he was appointed a director to the General Affairs Bureau of the Ministry for Interior, and supported Minister Wang Yitang.

In March 1940 the Wang Jingwei regime was established, Xia Suchu was appointed Executive Vice-chief to the Evaluation Departoment of the Examination Yuan. In same May he was transferred to Chief Secretary of the Examinaition Yuan. In next July he was transferred to Chief to the Agency for Secretary of the North China Political Council. In March 1942 he was appointed to Chief to the Agency for State Affairs of the same Council. In next February he resigned his post.

The whereabouts of Xia Suchu from after this point are unknown.

See also
 List of people who disappeared

References

Footnotes 

1889 births
1940s missing person cases
Chinese collaborators with Imperial Japan
Missing person cases in China
People from Qiannan
Republic of China politicians from Guizhou
Year of death uncertain